My Heart Has a Wish That You Would Not Go is the fourth and final studio album by Scottish band Aereogramme. The band drew the album name from the 1971 William Peter Blatty novel, The Exorcist. It was released on 5 February 2007 in the UK and Europe by Chemikal Underground, and on 6 February 2007 in North America by Sonic Unyon. The album was preceded by the single "Barriers" on 29 January 2007, which was released on 7" vinyl with the exclusive B-side "Dissolve".

Vocalist Craig B. revealed that the delay between My Heart Has a Wish and the band's previous release, 2004's Seclusion, was partly due to losing his singing voice for six months. Referring to the album's vocals, Craig B. stated in a 2010 interview with The Skinny that, "By the time we got to My Heart Has a Wish, I just didn't feel like screaming anymore. I think I wasn't as angry by then and it would have felt slightly dishonest to continue trying to have screaming songs just for the sake of it. I mean, when I unfortunately stumble upon a Linkin Park song on the radio I can't help but think that guy sounds like a dick. What's he angry about now? Slayer at least still sound genuinely pissed off."

In May 2007 the band announced that they were going to split after completion of the supporting tour. Aereogramme played their last show on 31 August 2007.

Track listing

Personnel
Aereogramme
 Craig B. – vocals, guitar
 Iain Cook – guitar, programming
 Campbell McNeil – bass
 Martin Scott – drums, percussion

Production
 Produced by Aereogramme and Martin Doherty
 Additional piano, keyboards, and vocals by Martin Doherty
 Violin solo on "Barriers" by Graham McGeoch
 Recorded at 4th Street Studios, Glasgow
 Mixed by Iain Cook at Johnny Alucard Studios, Glasgow
 Mastered by Zlaya Hadzic at Loud Mastering, Amsterdam
 Design by Samuel Baker

References

Aereogramme albums
2007 albums
Chemikal Underground albums
Sonic Unyon Records albums